Apple Inc. is an American multinational corporation that designs and manufactures consumer electronics and software products. It was established in Cupertino, California, on April 1, 1976, by Steve Jobs, Steve Wozniak, and Ronald Wayne, and was incorporated on January 3, 1977. The company's hardware products include the Macintosh line of personal computers, the iPod line of portable media players, the iPad line of tablets, the iPhone line of smartphones, the Apple TV line of digital media players, and the Apple Watch line of smartwatches. Apple's software products include the macOS, iOS, iPadOS, tvOS, and watchOS operating systems, the iTunes media player, the Safari web browser, and the iLife suite of multimedia and creativity software. , Apple is publicly known to have acquired more than 100 companies. The actual number of acquisitions is possibly larger as Apple does not reveal the majority of its acquisitions unless discovered by the press. Apple has cofounded two half-equity partnerships and purchased equity stakes in three preexisting companies, and has made three divestments. Apple has not released the financial details for the majority of its mergers and acquisitions.

Apple's business philosophy is to acquire small companies that can be easily integrated into existing company projects. For instance, Apple acquired Emagic and its professional music software, Logic Pro, in 2002. The acquisition was incorporated in the creation of the digital audio workstation software GarageBand, an integral part of the iLife software suite, and now one of the leading digital audio workstations on iOS and MacOS.

The company made its first acquisition on March 2, 1988, with its purchase of Network Innovations. In 2013, Apple acquired thirteen companies. Apple's largest acquisition was that of Beats Electronics in August 2014 for $3 billion. Of the companies Apple has acquired, 71 were based in the United States.

In early-May 2019, Apple CEO Tim Cook said to CNBC that Apple acquires a company every two to three weeks on average, having acquired 20 to 25 companies in the past six months alone.

Acquisitions

Stakes

Divestments

Significant investments in Apple

Institutional ownership
Apple Inc. is a public, joint-stock company registered with the SEC. , it has 4,715,280,000 outstanding shares. These are mainly held by institutional investors and funds. The top 16 institutional shareholders (and eight related, notable funds with over 25 million shares) are:
  (338,533,988): The Vanguard Group, Inc.
 (110,521,153): Vanguard Total Stock Market Index Fund
 (85,435,882): Vanguard 500 Index Fund
 (43,783,603): Vanguard Institutional Index Fund-Institutional Index Fund
 (30,726,434): Vanguard Growth Index Fund
  (296,598,349): BlackRock Inc.
 (30,589,798): BlackRock iShares Core S&P 500 ETF
  (249,589,329): Berkshire Hathaway, Inc.
  (185,419,773): State Street Corporation
 (49,752,710): SPDR S&P 500 Trust ETF
  (112,369,787): FMR, LLC
 (33,772,877): Fidelity 500 Index Fund
  (59,311,465): Northern Trust Corporation
  (58,414,412): Geode Capital Management, LLC
  (47,548,838): Norges Bank Investment Management incorporated
  (44,444,899): Bank of New York Mellon Corporation
  (43,431,586): Invesco Ltd.
 (37,375,269): Invesco QQQ Series 1 ETF
  (39,648,345): Bank of America Corp.
  (38,105,167): Morgan Stanley
  (37,679,873): JP Morgan Chase and Co.
  (33,304,696): Goldman Sachs Group Inc.
  (27,564,370): T. Rowe Price Associates Inc.
  (25,527,026): Wells Fargo & Company

Subsidiaries of Apple 
 Anobit
 Apple Energy
 Apple IMC
 Apple Sales International
 Apple Services
 Apple Worldwide Video
 Beats Electronics
 Beddit
 Braeburn Capital
 Claris International (formerly FileMaker Inc)
 Shazam

See also 
 List of largest mergers and acquisitions
 Lists of corporate acquisitions and mergers

Notes

References

Citations

Bibliography

External links
  – official website

Apple
Mergers and acquisitions